Air Marshal Sir John Barry Duxbury,  (23 January 1934 – 25 January 1997) was a senior commander in the Royal Air Force who served as Air Secretary from 1983 to 1985.

RAF career
Duxbury joined the Royal Air force in 1953. He became Officer Commanding No. 201 Squadron in 1971 and Station Commander at RAF St Mawgan in 1976. He was appointed Secretary to the Chief of Staffs' Committee in 1978, joined the Senior Directing Staff (Air) at the Royal College of Defence Studies in 1981 and became Air Secretary in 1982. He served as Air Officer Commanding No. 18 Group from 1986 and retired in 1990.

Retirement
In retirement he became a Chief Executive of the Society of British Aerospace Companies. He also had an appointment as a director of one of Gerald Carroll's Carroll Group companies.

References

|-

1934 births
1997 deaths
Commanders of the Order of the British Empire
Knights Commander of the Order of the Bath
Royal Air Force air marshals